is a Japanese anime series produced by NAS and TV Tokyo and animated by Studio Gallop. The series aired on TV Tokyo from 1991 to 1992. The show was one of multimedia content strategies—prevalent in Japan around the early 1990s— and several renditions of the content were released, that is, in the forms of manga, anime, PC Engine game. In this article mainly the anime version is explored. It contains a lot of parodies from old Japanese anime and live action shows, e.g., Kiki's Delivery Service, and Sailor Moon (since Usagi Tsukino was played by the same voice actress (Kotono Mitsuishi) as a heroine of this show. The game was released in 1991, a side-scroller by NEC Home Electronics. The manga series has two versions: one authored by Eiichi Saitō that ran on Comic Bonbon in 1991, first followed an early version of scenario outlines in the development, but later put an end to that and adapted a new one that by and large follows the anime version's stories; one authored by Kazuhiko Shimamoto that ran on Deluxe Bonbon, one of the Comic Bonbon franchise issued from 1990 to 1995 as a comedy-manga magazine, in 1991, has stories completely different from the anime ones though the names of characters are identical.

Plot
Agedama Genji is a 4th grade student who is a hero on the training from 'Hero Planet'. Though the cheerful youngster is no one special in appearance, he can transform into a superhero called "Agedaman" by combining himself with the compatible computer friend called Wapuro. He believes in Kiai power and he tries to handle all the problems that he encounters with that, so his father decided to let him go training on Earth accompanied by Wapuro on summer vacation. When they plot to attack the city she transforms into a super-villainess called "Onyomiko". The battles of Agedaman and Onyomiko began!

Characters
 Agedama Genji (voiced by Nozomu Sasaki)
 The leading character of the show, born on 26 October, a daredevil boy and doesn't give a damn to any problem he could get. When Onyomiko accompanied by a synthesized monster tries to attack Morisoba city he turns to be a savior but the fact that he's a superhero mustn't be discovered by any earthling. He's got a crush on a girl called Ibuki Heike in his class since the very first day of school—when he fell in love with her at first sight. He uses his characteristic expressions (e.g., 'thanky!' for 'thank you'), and wears a wristwatch-shaped corded phone handset, one of Wapuro's accessories, that enables him to communicate with Wapuro when he's away, also, Wapuro's able to receive phone calls and route them to the handset. When he transforms into Agedaman he use the weapons like Frisbee called 'Double Frisbay,' which the hero in the read-and-white costume wears on each hip, also produces Kiai Cards (looks like ROM called HuCard for PC engine) from his headgear by concentrating his kiai energy, and, by inserting them into a slot that opens on the upper rim of an ornament on the chest of the armor, is able to use special abilities, e.g., Fire Card, Whack-a-Mole Card, Facsimile Card, Cheese Card, and Crab Meat Can Card. but to produce Kiai Cards, Agedaman has to tackle an opponent for a while since, meanwhile, Wapuro's eyes on Agedaman's visor need to analyse the opponent's data and once he founds weak points the hero makes an effort to concentrate his kiai energies and then a particular card that goes straight for the jugular of the opponent pops out from an earmuff of the headgear. By pressing the caps key in a keyboard on his gauntlet, he's able to "capitalize" his body (a giant form).  The family name is named after The Tale of Genji, a classic Japanese literature, and the given name means agedama (also called tenkasu.) The name of the show comes from his name in Japanese naming order, Genji Agedama, and Tsūshin in the middle of it literally means communication, but especially telecommunication here on account of his use of the computer friend.
 Wapuro (voiced by Kumiko Watanabe)
 Agedama's best friend, a word processor robot, hence the name (abbreviation for word processor in Japanese), though the body of the type machine is usually football-shaped with retractable feet and a pair of antennas, is able to change it into six other "modes", that is, Armadillo (when he's in a haunted mansion where he and Agedama, Ebiten and Okame live,) School-Bag (carried on Agedama's back when they're in school,) Pocketbike(running on roads when his best friend wakes up late and hurries,) Jet(which is able to fly in the stratosphere and penetrate the walls of a spacecraft,) Submarine(which protects a passenger with the canopy but the seat is too small for the 10-year-old to get on board,) and Agedaman (combining himself with Agedama: the transforming procedure is called 'Henkan (変換).' This word processor robot can't help but pronounce all letters, even punctuation when he speaks, e.g., at the end of Agedaman-transformation procedure, he says "Henkan is done dot," when he feels at a loss for words hearing dumb words from friends, shuts his mouth and says "...(dot dot dot)", and, when giving a holler, shouts "Agedama!! (Agedama double exclamation)".
 Ibuki Heike (voiced by Kotono Mitsuishi)
The heroine of the show, born on 15 July, is in love with Agedaman (not Agedama because she loves the superhero, who saves the world, but, little by little, gets into his everyday persona which she thinks just talks the talk, too. She cares her little brother and friends and doesn't give way to Rei, the bossy classmate who calls the shots in her class, being fair and square. But sometimes goes crazy: laughs like hell when hearing something funny (inherited this from her mother,) goes insane playing the games of rock-paper-scissors and goldfish scooping, etc. The family is named after The Tale of Heike (a classic novel published centuries ago as well as that of Genji.)On the final Episodes she becomes a superheroine, which makes references of Sailor Moon(Her Transformation scene,Poses and the voice actress).
 Rei Kuki (voiced by Sakiko Tamagawa)
An antagonist of the series, born on 21 August, takes advantage of her wealthy family, uses her grandfather's authority and scatters money to make everything her way, however, feels very lonely inside her heart because her parents are busy and travel around the world so much that they don't have time to pay attention to their child, thus is in the charge of her grandfather being neglected by them. When wearing an Onyomiko suit she's the commander of a synth-monster and makes that creature play havoc with things that get in the way of her goal. By combining herself with P-Shiro, Kuki's counterpart of the word processor robot, Onyomiko transforms to a stronger form, Hyper-Onyomiko, but hardly wants to do it because she has to be stripped by the robot, who's like a dirty old man, in the transformation procedure. The family name is named after Kuki clan, which consisted of famous samurai. The alias is a portmanteau of On'yomi (one of the two ways of kanji reading) and miko (Shinto priestess) because, in an early stage of scenario development, another storyline—in which Onyomiko and Bifū Kunreikan (the family name is a portmanteau of Kun'yomi and shireikan (commander)) plot to rule all the kanji around the world and Agedaman comes and fights to save people—was laid on the table, the manga versions followed this plot.
 Raizo Kuki (voiced by Junpei Takiguchi)
An antagonist, Rei's grandfather, a.k.a. Nottoridamus XI, a descendant of a great prophet, Nottoridamus I, whose name is a pun on nottori (Japanese:taking over someone else's property) and damasu (to deceive) and also a spoof of Nostradamus' predictions. He interprets the ancestor's prophecies and, according to interpretations he orders his henchmen to bring ingredients to his underground laboratory in a mansion he lives, and, by putting them into Monster Cooker, creates miscellaneous monsters to achieve his goal: taking over the world. When he was young the rich old man was so poor that he hardly had money to buy small dried fish and  umeboshi. But, by interpreting the ancestor's prophecies, he'd bought and sold shares his way to the top and quickly became the world's richest man surpassing Rockefeller family.
Ebiten (voiced by Masahiro Anzai)
An old fairy, takes care of Agedama on earth, the small body is always in a rice bowl. The name is a portmanteau of Ebisu (a member of Seven Lucky Gods) and ebi-tempura (shrimp tempura). From the PC Engine game, without a major redesign.
Okame (voiced by Masako Miura)
Ebiten's wife, an old fairy, makes food for Agedama, the body is a small jar. Modeled directly after Okame (Noh mask: that of an ugly chubby woman used as a comedy relief between serious performances; its name origin is a Japanese word, kame (jar), since each of its plump cheek looks like a round shape a clay jar; nowadays it's known as the mascot of a natto brand called Okame Natto more than as the traditional mask.) From the game, without a major redesign.
Oolong-Tea (voiced by Katsumi Suzuki)
A protagonist, but doesn't side with anyone, wears a Chinese costume, a money grubber, though he's a 4th grader in Agedama's class, looks like a middle aged man. From the game, without a major redesign.
P-shiro (voiced by Kōzō Shioya)
An antagonist, personal computer robot, made by the Monster-Cooker from Rei's stuffed panda (called Pan-chan) that'd been Rei's best friend since she'd been a toddler. Speaks with Kansai accent and always has a cigarette on the lips. The name is a play on words with PC (Japanese pronunciation:pee-shee) and Shiro (a given name for Japanese males or for pets.)
Kensaku Morikawa (voiced by Tomoyuki Morikawa)
The teacher in charge of Agedama's class wearing a kendo suit. Though he can't resist Kuki's power, the young honest teacher who believes in the power of youth couldn't care less about what he would get when scolding the rich girl who has tantrums, and goes so far to spank her bottom with his hand just worrying about the future of the rude child as a teacher. He's got a crush on a female colleague who he calls Hitomi-sensei. When he was a student he was the captain of a sumo club in school, weighed 100kg (220lbs). His character is modeled after Kensaku Morita.
Kuki's three butlers
The henchmen of Raizo and Rei in sunglasses and black suit, though they're titled "butlers," work also as bodyguard, chauffeur, valet, cook, dining musician, pilot, soldier, etc. When Raizo creates a synth-monster one of them has to be a human ingredient of a monster (apart from rare occasions when Rei or Raizo wants to be a monster her/himself.) Although they're promised that their salary should be 2,000,000 yen per month it's gradually cut down when the henchmen make a blunder or make the boss and bossy girl mad, so they end up getting paid just 50,000 yen (approx. 405 US dollars) every month. these surnames are the top three most common Japanese ones.
Satō (voiced by Tomoyuki Morikawa)
Medium height, lives in a small apartment with his wife (called Nabeko) and baby, from Tokushima prefecture and is enthusiastic about Awa dance—a local dance of his hometown.
Tanaka (voiced by Wataru Takagi)
The tall one, owns a house, honest and, when chosen for a synth-monster ingredient, doesn't hesitate to sacrifice himself thinking about his wife and kids.
Suzuki (voiced by Tetsuya Iwanaga)
The short one, the only single person in the group, lives in a small apartment full of noise from the railroad track near it, easy-going and sometimes the colleagues find that he's like lolicon as he has an obsession with knee-high socks and, when seeing a girl wearing a pair, can't help but roll it down to the ankle (he calls that movement 'kutsushita kururun(socks roll)'. He's got a crush on a woman, Miss Shiratori, who lives in his hometown. The full name is Antarō Suzuki. 
 Katsuo Harada (voiced by Bin Shimada)
The leader of Rei's guard force in Agedama's class, a fat kid, friends call him 'Tsuripan (suspender shorts),' a vice president of his father's real estate agency which is under Kuki group (Kodama, Ibuki's little brother, pointed out that the agency is no more than a family-owned company.)
 Hitomi Kirara(CV Wakana Yamazaki)
A female teacher in East-Morisoba Elementary who Kensaku's got crush on. Though the beautiful down-to-earth woman considers relationship, in reality she loves machismo, not to say, chauvinism, so, nurses her emotions and waits for the old-fashioned straightforward teacher to become wild.
 Kodama Heike (voiced by Satomi Kōrogi (in episode 6) → Ikue Ōtani (from episode 13 to the final))
Ibuki's little brother, 3 years old, a big fan of Agedaman who pretends to be the hero and calls himself "Agedaman 2," his brother. Uses 12.5cm (5 inch) kick, a copycat of 16-mon kick, the nickname for Giant Baba's kicking.
Modam (voiced by Bin Shimada)
A villain from Hero Planet in high school uniform. Principally everyone on that planet is given birth to be a good hero/heroine but once in a blue moon an exception falls down to the planet, and when they have an evil-minded one, they take off clothes from him/her and exile from the planet by launching him/her into outer space and that spacecraft is destined for an uninhabited planet. This long-haired guy and his sister, E-huv, in birthday suit accidentally landed on the earth. Modeled after a character, Paptimus Schirocco in Mobile Suit Zeta Gundam, who was played by the same voice actor. The name is a play on words with modem and Adam.
E-Huv (voiced by Megumi Hayashibara)
A villainess from Hero Planet in high school uniform. Modam's sister. The name is a play on words with Ethernet hub and Eve.
Hikari Yumenokōji (voiced by Kappei Yamaguchi)
A rival of Agedama, track and field athlete, preppy boy in another elementary school in Morisoba city. Based on an antagonist of the game and manga, Bifū Kunreikan, whose sister is Onyomiko, but they're not siblings in the anime version and both of them are largely redesigned.
Yuri Shiratori (voiced by Yuri Shiratori)
A female friend of Suzuki who he's secretly loved since their childhood. When they were in elementary, just after the short man, who looked like Tatsuya Uesugi in the anime/manga series called Touch, asked her what type of socks she preferred from tights, knee-high and medium socks and she hesitantly but immediately answered "...knee-high, so?" the handsome kid, who would lose that pretty face when grown up, happily said "Me too! Let me roll down your knee-highs!" and ran to her feet and did 'kutsushita kururun (socks roll) on her leg, then she scarily screamed and ran away from him shedding tears and "climbed to a sunset sky (this climbing is a parody of a scene in a Studio Ghibli movie called Only Yesterday, thus, the looks of Suzuki's first love and Taeko Okajima, the leading character of that movie, are identical when they were schoolgirls. Named after the voice actress.
Headteacher (voiced by Junichi Sugawara)
Of East-Morisoba Elementary. An example of a bad teacher who brown-noses Raizo, the chairman of the school.
Deputy Headteacher (voiced by Katsumi Suzuki)
Of East-Morisoba Elementary. An obsequious teacher, too.
 Hotaru Heike (voiced by Masako Miura)
Ibuki's mother, who has a quick and easy laugh, she and her daughter can keep cracking up with any bad comedy. The name's from 'Japanese firefly (heikebotaru)'.
 Kanio Heike (voiced by Junichi Sugawara)
Ibuki's father, who lives in a small apartment with his family and dreams of owning a house. The name is from 'Samurai crab (heikegani)'
 Yamabuki Heike (voiced by Sumi Shimamoto)
A distant relative of Ibuki's family, a beautiful middle-aged woman. Raizo fell in love with the reminder of his late wife in her younger years at first sight when Tsuripan's father offered him an arranged marriage setting and he saw a photo of the woman in kimono.
 Kiku Kuki (voiced by Sumi Shimamoto)
Raizo's late wife, Rei doesn't know her since she'd died before the granddaughter was born. Just after World War II, when a thief snatched a sack of rice the young woman just bought in a black market, the poor young man who would later become mega-rich caught the quick thief and knocked him down and brought it back to the wife-to-be. Her name is an anagram of Kuki and means chrysanthemum.
 Yoshio Harada (voiced by Yu Shimaka)
Tsuripan's father, runs a real estate agency which is an affiliate of Raizo's conglomerate and is loyal to the crazy old man. This fat man is one of few people who was picked out for a synth-monster ingredient apart from the butlers.
The owner of Ganko-Tei (voiced by Masahiro Anzai)
A middle-aged man, runs a ramen restaurant called Ganko-Tei, where Kensaku has frequented since the teacher was a student. The cook uses a special martial art technique that he calls 'Noodle Bound,' which he invented himself after he'd got through hard training in Hida Mountains, the fighting manoeuvre consists of casting noodles against an opponent and binding the body, so the more the victim tries to get out of the knot the tighter they tangle, but when a synth-monster who he fought told him that noodle is only as strong as its softest link and ate it, he went down and decided to train himself going back to the mountains again.
Masumasu Yamanoki (voiced by Katsumi Suzuki)
A so-called professional food connoisseur, a middle-aged man in glasses. Agedama and friends happen to see him every so often as another diner in Ganko-Tei. Modeled after a food and rakugo critic Masuhiro Yamamoto.
Mika (voiced by Chisa Yokoyama (in episode 6) → Kumiko Watanabe)
A young adult woman, sometimes happens to be there when Agedaman and Onyomiko combat in the city, dating a man (she calls him Katchi) who she's deeply in love with. She is a parody of Rika in Tokyo Love Story, a contemporary popular love romance series at that time.
Katchi (voiced by Bin Shimada)
A young adult man, Mika's boyfriend. When they want to kiss or hug each other in good scenes the fighting lad and lass often exchange blows around them and ruin their sweet moments. The other half of Mika is a spoof of Kanchi, Rika's boyfriend, in Tokyo Love Story.

Staff
Pre-production Writers: Sukehiro Tomita, Akira Sakuma
Draft Scenario Writer: Ōji Hiroi
Draft Character Designer: Kennosuke Mizutani
Executive Producer: Yoshibumi Sugisawa
Director: Masato Namiki
Character Designer, Animation Director: Hatsuki Tsuji
Animation Supervisor: Tadashi Kudo
Cinematographers: Hiroaki Edamitsu→Katsuya Kozutsumi
Music Composer: Toshihiko Sahashi
Director of Audiography: Kazuo Harada
Producers: Shinsuke Kuramochi (TV Tokyo), Yutaka Sugiyama (Nihon Ad Systems), Akio Wakana (Studio Gallop)
Frame Drawing Studios: Thumbtack Kikaku, Nakamura Production, Bunsei Animation, Animal-Ya, Wombat, Film Magic, Studio Musashi
Background Illustrator: Kobayashi Production
Color Coordinators: Yukitaka Shishikai, Naoko Kodama
Cel Painting Studios: Studio Marin, Sendai Animation, Onion Production, Bunsei Animation, Dong Woo Animation, Oscar Kikaku
Camera Operators/Best Boys: Yasunori Hayama, Katsuya Kozutsumi, Hisao Kazayama, Tōru Kobayashi, Hiroshi Nakatomi, Yasuhiro Shimizu, Hiroshi Tamura, Kenji Akazawa, Satoshi Arakawa, Yoshiaki Tsutsui, Yutaka Hasegawa, Ayako Īri, Hideo Kikukawa, Akira Kato
Recording Engineers: Takeshi Seyama, Hiroshi Adachi
Logo Designing Company: Maki Production
Film Developer: Tokyo Laboratory ltd.
Sound Effects Creator: Top Sound
Foley Artist: Mitsuru Kageyama (Fizz Sound Creation)
Music Supervisor: Hisashi Kawai
Mix Engineer: Fujio Yamada
Assistant Director: Naoko Yagi
Recording Studio: New Japan Studio
Managers: Masaru Wakita (TV Tokyo,) Yoshio Ōtsuka (Studio Gallop)
Writers' Assistant: Hiroshi Tsuruta
Line Producer: Hiroshi Oyama
Production Assistants: Hiroshi Ōsawa, Noriyuki Mitsuhashi, Yasuhiro Geshi, Hiroshi Oyama, Yoshito Kuwa, Ryōki Kamitsubo
Gofer: Sachiko Nakazumi
PR Manager: Mari Itō (TV Tokyo)
Technical Adviser: Ryōsuke Takahashi
Mandy Actors: Arts Vision
Animation Creator: Studio Gallop
Broadcaster: TV Tokyo

Music

Theme songs
"Opening Theme 1: Jinsei Madamada Agedaman" (from episode 1 to 26)
 Lyrics by: Yūko Ōtomo
 Composed by: Toshihiko Sahashi
 Arranged by: Toshihiko Sahashi
 Sung by：Kaori Honma (later known as Kaori Futenma)
Not officially translated, means 'You've got a long way to go, Agedaman.' The lyrics has nothing to do with the anime's stories.
 "Opening theme 2: Jishin Manman Agedaman" (from episode 27 to the final)
 Lyrics by: Mitsuko Shiramine
 Composed by: Toshihiko Sahashi
 Arranged by: Toshihiko Sahashi
 Sung by: Nozomu Sasaki
Means 'Gutsy Agedaman.' Agedaman's theme song, the voice actor sings himself in a lower key.
 "Closing Theme 1: Sekai wa Watashi no Tameni" (from episode 1 to 26)
 Lyrics by: Yūko Ōtomo
 Composed by: Toshihiko Sahashi
 Arranged by: Toshihiko Sahashi
 Sung by: Kaori Honma (later known as Kaori Futenma)
Means 'The World Is Dedicated to Me.' One of Rei's theme songs, a teenage pop singer who just debuted that year, Kaori Honma (later changed her stage name to the real one, Kaori Futenma) sings the villainess' ambition, to conquer the world. In the animation, Rei is taking a bubble bath.
 "Closing Theme 2: Kanzenmuketsu no Jōō-sama" (from episode 27 to the final)
 Lyrics by: Mitsuko Shiramine
 Composed by: Toshihiko Sahashi
 Arranged by: Toshihiko Sahashi
 Sung by：Sakiko Tamagawa with Tomoyuki Morikawa, Wataru Takagi and Tetsuya Iwanaga (chatter)
Means 'Absolute Queen.' Another theme song for Rei, the voice actress sings herself going out of mind. The butlers grumble after she brag about herself. At the end of the song, Rei laughs crazily and Tanaka butts in and tells her "An ambulance has come!"

Featured song
 "Chikyū wo Todokeyō" (from episode 49 to the final)
 Lyrics by: Mitsuko Shiramine
 Composed by: Toshihiko Sahashi
 Arranged by: Toshihiko Sahashi
 Sung by：Nozomu Sasaki
Means 'Send from Earth.' Used in the showdown with Modam and E-Huv, friends and other people on earth sing this song to send energies to Agedaman in a pinch. Kotono Mitsuishi, who plays Ibuki, sings this song, too, her version was just meant for use in Ibuki's fight scene in episode 49, thus, is not a full-length song.

External links
NAS page 

1991 anime television series debuts
1991 Japanese television series debuts
1992 Japanese television series endings
Gallop (studio)
TV Tokyo original programming
Superheroes in anime and manga